Thomas Keele may refer to:

 Thomas Keell
Thomas Keele (MP) for Wycombe (UK Parliament constituency)